Riverview was an unincorporated community on Sauvie Island in Multnomah County, Oregon, United States. According to the United States Geological Survey, a settlement named Riverview may not have existed in this location.

References

Unincorporated communities in Multnomah County, Oregon
Unincorporated communities in Oregon